The Interosseous intercuneiform ligaments are short fibrous bands that connect the adjacent surfaces of the medial and intermediate, and the intermediate and lateral cuneiform bones. It is one of the 3 ligaments responsible for maintaining the transverse arch of the foot together with the interosseous ligaments of metatarsals and the transverse metatarsal ligament.

Ligaments of the lower limb